Zabrus idaeus is a species of ground beetle in the Pterostichinae subfamily that is endemic to Turkey.

References

Beetles described in 1968
Beetles of Asia
Endemic fauna of Turkey
Zabrus